World Fashion Channel is an international satellite and cable TV channel about fashion, lifestyle and celebrity. Television broadcasts around the world, has 2 versions: the Russian and international. The Russian version of the channel (all content is translated into Russian) covers Russia and the CIS countries, has more than 20.25 million viewers. The international version covers Europe, Asia and the Asia-Pacific region, Australia, America, Canada, Middle East, Russia, CIS and Baltic countries; has more than 18.500.000 viewers.

The content consists of the latest news and events of the fashion world, season trends, reports from the main fashion weeks, documentaries about designers and best fashion shows. World Fashion Channel crews work at New York, London, Paris and Milan Fashion Weeks. They take part in the leading events of the fashion world. World Fashion Channel acts as a media partner at international film premiers, music festivals and leading events of the fashion world. World Fashion Channel established World Fashion Luxury Awards to celebrate achievements of the premium segment brands.

Fashion-related television channels
Fashion-themed television series
Television channels and stations established in 2005